Fame may refer to:

Books
 Fame: an art project, a 2013 book and series of paintings by Robert Priseman
 Fame (novel) (German Ruhm), a 2009 novel by Daniel Kehlmann
 Fame, a 2005 novel by Karen Kingsbury
 Fame,  a 2008 novel by Mark Rowlands
 Fame, a 2011 novel by Tilly Bagshawe

Film, television and stage 
 Fame (1936 film), a British comedy
 Fame (1980 film), an American musical
 Fame (1982 TV series), a 1982–1987 television adaptation of the film
 Fame (2009 film), a remake of the musical film
 Fame (musical), a stage adaptation of the film that premiered in 1988
 Fame (2003 TV series), a talent competition
 Fame: The Musical (Irish TV series), an Irish version of the NBC talent show 
 Fame (2007 film), a stand-up tour and DVD by Ricky Gervais
 "Fame" (Law & Order), a 2006 episode of Law & Order
 "Fame", a 2010 episode of NCIS: Los Angeles
 "Fame", a 1978 episode in the Hallmark Hall of Fame

Music 
 FAME Studios, a recording studio
 Fame (duo), a musical duo
 Georgie Fame, English R&B jazz musician Clive Powell (born 1943)
 Fame (Thai band)

Albums
 Fame (Grace Jones album), a 1978 album by Grace Jones
 Fame (soundtrack), 1980 soundtrack album to the musical film Fame
 The Fame, the 2008 debut album by Lady Gaga
 F.A.M.E. (Chris Brown album), 2011
 F.A.M.E. (Maluma album), 2018
 Fame (EP), the 2020 debut album of Han Seung-woo

Songs
 "Fame" (David Bowie song), Recorded and released in 1975, written by Bowie, Carlos Alomar and John Lennon
 "Fame" (Irene Cara song), winner of Academy Award for Best Original Song (from the above 1980 film)
 "F.A.M.E." (song), by Young Jeezy
 "Fame (The Game)", a song by Donna Summer
 "The Fame", a song by Lady Gaga from her debut album, The Fame
 "Fame", a song by B.o.B from his album, B.o.B Presents: The Adventures of Bobby Ray
 "F.A.M.E", a 2020 song by Hooligan Hefs, featuring Hooks, Hooligan Skinny and Masi Rooc

Acronyms
 Future American Magical Entertainers, a former magic club for young magicians
 FAME (database) (Forecasting Analysis and Modeling Environment), a database and programming language
 Fatty acid methyl esters
 Full-sky Astrometric Mapping Explorer, a proposed astrometric satellite canceled in 2002
 Fashion Malawi Edition (FAME), a fashion development organization
 Fans of Adult Media and Entertainment Awards, created in 2006
 Federation of Archaeological Managers and Employers, founded in 1975

Places in the United States
 Fame, Mississippi, an unincorporated community
 Fame, West Virginia, an unincorporated community

Ships
 , numerous ships of the Royal Navy
 , numerous merchant ships

Other uses
 Fame (magazine), an American celebrity monthly 1988–1991
 Fame (Confederate monument) or Gloria Victis, a Confederate memorial in Salisbury, North Carolina
 Lady Gaga Fame, a fragrance for women endorsed by Lady Gaga

See also

 Famous (disambiguation)
 Notability
 Pheme, the personification of fame and renown